TotalEnergies SE is a French multinational integrated energy and petroleum company founded in 1924 and is one of the seven supermajor oil companies. Its businesses cover the entire oil and gas chain, from crude oil and natural gas exploration and production to power generation, transportation, refining, petroleum product marketing, and international crude oil and product trading. TotalEnergies is also a large-scale chemicals manufacturer.

TotalEnergies has its head office in the Tour Total in La Défense district in Courbevoie, west of Paris. The company is a component of the Euro Stoxx 50 stock market index. In the 2020 Forbes Global 2000, it was ranked as the 29th-largest public company in the world, and additionally ranked as the 25th largest company of any type on the Fortune Global 500.

History

1924–1985: Compagnie française des pétroles
The company was founded after World War I, when petrol was seen as vital in case of a new war with Germany. The then French President Raymond Poincaré rejected the idea of forming a partnership with Royal Dutch Shell in favour of creating an entirely French oil company. At Poincaré's behest, Col. Ernest Mercier with the support of 90 banks and companies founded Total in 1924, as the Compagnie française des pétroles (CFP) (in English, the French Petroleum Company).

As per the agreement reached during the San Remo conference of 1920, the French state received the 25% share held by Deutsche Bank in the Turkish Petroleum Company (TPC) as part of the compensation for war damages caused by Germany during World War I. The French government's stake in TPC was transferred to CFP, and the Red Line agreement in 1928 rearranged the shareholding of CFP in TPC (later renamed the Iraq Petroleum Company in 1929) to 23.75%. The company from the start was regarded as a private sector company in view of its listing on the Paris Stock Exchange in 1929.

During the 1930, the company was engaged in exploration and production, primarily from the Middle East. Its first refinery began operating in Normandy in 1933. After World War II, CFP engaged in oil exploration in Venezuela, Canada, and Africa while pursuing energy sources within France. Exploration in Algeria, then a French colony, began in 1946, with Algeria becoming a leading source of oil in the 1950s.

In 1954, CFP introduced its downstream product – Total brand of gasoline in the continent of Africa and Europe.

Total entered the United States in 1971 by acquiring Leonard Petroleum of Alma, Michigan and several Standard Oil of Indiana stations in Metro Detroit.

In 1980, Total Petroleum (North America) Ltd., a company controlled 50% by CFP, bought the American refining and marketing assets of Vickers Petroleum as part of a sell-off by Esmark of its energy holdings. This purchase gave Total refining capacity, transportation, and a network of 350 service stations in 20 states.

1985–2003: Total CFP and rebranding to Total

Total's leadership had been aware of the deleterious effects of global warming since at least 1971; The company nevertheless openly denied the findings of climate science until the 1990s; Total also pursued a number of strategies to cover up the threat and contribution to the climate crisis.

The company renamed itself Total CFP in 1985, to build on the popularity of its gasoline brand. Later in 1991, the name was changed to Total, when it became a public company listed on the New York Stock Exchange. In 1991, the French government held more than 30 percent of the company's stock but by 1996 had reduced its stake to less than 1 percent. In the time period between 1990 and 1994, foreign ownership of the firm increased from 23 per cent to 44 per cent.

Meanwhile, Total continued to expand its retail presence in North America under several brand names. In 1989, Denver, Colorado–based Total Petroleum, Total CFP's North American unit, purchased 125 Road Runner retail locations from Texarkana, Texas–based Truman Arnold Companies. By 1993, Total Petroleum was operating 2,600 retail stores under the Vickers, Apco, Road Runner, and Total brands. That year, the company began remodeling and rebranding all of its North American gasoline and convenience stores to use the Total name. Only four years later, Total sold its North American refining and retail operations to Ultramar Diamond Shamrock for $400 million in stock and $414 million in assumed debt.

After Total's takeover of Petrofina of Belgium in 1999, it became known as Total Fina. Afterwards it also acquired Elf Aquitaine. First named TotalFinaElf after the merger in 2000, its name reverted to Total in 2003. During that rebranding, the globe logo was unveiled.

2003–2021
In 2003, Total signed for a 30% stake in the gas exploration venture in the Kingdom of Saudi Arabia (KSA) – South Rub' al-Khali joint venture along with Royal Dutch Shell and Saudi Aramco. The stake was later bought out by its partners.

In 2006, Saudi Aramco and Total signed a MOU to develop the Jubail Refinery and Petrochemical project in Saudi Arabia which targeted 400,000 barrels per day (bpd). Two years later, the two companies officially established a joint venture called SAUDI ARAMCO TOTAL Refining and Petrochemical Company (SATORP)-  in which a 62.5% stake was held by Saudi Aramco and the balance 37.5% held by TOTAL.

Total withdrew in 2006 from all Iranian development work because of United Nations concerns that resulted in sanctions over possible weaponization of the Nuclear program of Iran.

During the 2009–2010 Iraqi oil services contracts tender, a consortium led by CNPC (37.5%), which also included TOTAL (18.75%) and Petronas (18.75%) was awarded a production contract for the "Halfaya field" in the south of Iraq, which contains an estimated  of oil.

As of 2010, Total had over 96,000 employees and operated in more than 130 countries. In 2010, Total announced plans to pull out of the forecourt market in the United Kingdom.

In 2012, Total announced it was selling its 20% stake and operating mandate in its Nigerian offshore project to a unit of China Petrochemical Corp for $2.5 billion.

In 2013, Total started the operation at Kashagan with North Caspian Operating Company. It is the biggest discovery of oil reserves since 1968. In 2013, Total increased its stake in Novatek to 16.96%. In 2013, Total and its joint venture partner agreed to buy Chevron Corporation's retail distribution business in Pakistan for an undisclosed amount.

In January 2014, Total became the first major oil and gas firm to acquire exploration rights for shale gas in the UK after it bought a 40 percent interest in two licences in the Gainsborough Trough area of northern England for $48 million. In July 2014, the company disclosed it was in exclusive talks to sell its LPG distribution business in France to Pennsylvania-based UGI Corporation for €450 million ($615 million).

On 20 October 2014, at 23:57 MST a Dassault Falcon 50 business jet heading to Paris caught fire and exploded during takeoff after colliding with a snow removal vehicle in Vnukovo International Airport, and killing four, including three crew members and CEO of Total S.A. Christophe de Margerie on board. Alcohol presence was confirmed in the blood of the driver of the vehicle on the ground. Patrick Pouyanne, who was Total's Refining Chief at that time, was appointed as CEO, and also as chairman of Total in 2015.

In 2015, Total unveiled plans to cut 180 jobs in the United Kingdom, reduce refinery capacity and slow spending on North Sea fields after it fell to a $5.7bn final-quarter loss. The company said it would also sell off $5bn worth of assets worldwide and cut exploration costs by 30%.

In 2016, Total signed a $224M deal to buy Lampiris, the third-largest Belgian supplier of gas and renewable energy to expand its gas and power distribution activities.

In 2016, Total agreed to buy French battery maker Saft Groupe S.A. in a $1.1bn deal, to boost its development in renewable energy and electricity businesses.

In 2016, Total agreed to acquire $2.2-billion in upstream and downstream assets from Petrobras as part of the firms' strategic alliance announced earlier that year. For Total, these new partnerships with Petrobras reinforce Total's position in Brazil through access to new fields in the Santos Basin while entering the gas value chain.

Between 2013 and 2017, Total organized the ARGOS Challenge, a robotic competition with the aim to develop robots for their oil and gas production sites. It was won by an Austrian-German team using a variant of the taurob tracker robot.

In 2017, Total signed a deal for a total amount of $4.8b with Iran for the development and production of South Pars, the world's largest gas field. The deal was the first foreign investment in Iran since in the 2015 sanctions over Iran's nuclear weaponisation were lifted by the JCPOA.

In 2017, Total announced the acquisition of Maersk Oil for $7.45 billion in a share and debt transaction. This deal positioned Total as the second operator in the North Sea.

In 2017, Total signed an agreement with EREN Renewable energy to acquire an interest of 23% in EREN RE for an amount of €237.5 million.

In November 2017, Total announced the launch on the French residential market of Total Spring, a natural gas and green power offering that is 10% cheaper than regulated tariffs. Total is thus pursuing its strategy of downstream integration in the gas and power value chain in Europe.

In 2018, Total officially withdrew from the Iranian South Pars gas field because of sanctions pressure from the US.

In 2019, Total announced sale of 30% stake in the Trapil pipeline network to crude oil storage operator Pisto SAS for €260 million. Later that year, Total signed deals to transfer 30% and 28.33% of its assets in Namibia's Block 2913B and Block 2912 respectively to QatarEnergy. The company will also transfer 40% of its existing 25% interests in the Orinduik and Kanuku blocks of Guyana and 25% interest in Blocks L11A, L11B, and L12 of Kenya to QatarEnergy.

In 2020, the company announced its intention to cut 500 voluntary jobs in France.

In 2021, Total left the American Petroleum Institute lobby, due to differences on the common vision on how to tackle the fight against climate change.

In 2021, Total said that it had registered an income of $3 billion for the period of January–March, which is close to the levels registered before the pandemic.

2021–present: Rebranding to TotalEnergies

In 2021, the company announced a name change to TotalEnergies as an intended illustration of its investments in the production of green electricity. At the Ordinary and Extraordinary Shareholders’ Meeting in May of that year, shareholders approved the name change to TotalEnergies.

In 2022, TotalEnergies announced it would end all operations in Myanmar, citing rampant human rights abuses and deteriorating rule of law since the 2021 Myanmar coup d'état and has also called for international sanctions targeting the oil and gas sector in the country, which is one of the main sources of revenue for Myanmar's government.

As of 11 March 2022, Total was one of the only Western oil companies to continue operating in Russia after the Russian Invasion of Ukraine.

Financial data

Organization

Business segments 

In 2016, Total set up a new organization to achieve its ambition to become a responsible energy major. It is composed of the following segments:
 Exploration & Production
 Gas, Renewables & Power 
 Refining & Chemicals
 Trading & Shipping
 Marketing & Services
 Total Global Services

In 2016 Total also created two new corporate divisions:
namely People & Social Responsibility (Human Resources; Health, Safety & Environment; the Security Division; and a new Civil Society Engagement Division) and Strategy & Innovation (Strategy & Climate Division, responsible for ensuring that strategy incorporates the 2 °C global warming scenario, Public Affairs, Audit, Research & Development, the Chief Digital Officer and the Senior Vice President Technology).

Subsidiaries and affiliates 

, TotalEnergies had 903 subsidiaries consolidated into the group results, together with affiliate investments and joint ventures, mostly in LPG. In addition, Total had other equity holdings amounting to about 3bn euros, treated as investments, and was involved in a number of significant joint ventures, mostly relating to LPG and LNG exploration, production, and shipping.

The joint ventures which are treated as subsidiaries are listed in the consolidated subsidiary section.

Main consolidated subsidiaries

 Abu Dhabi Gas Liquefaction Company Ltd (5.00%), United Arab Emirates
 Air Total International S.A., Switzerland
 Amyris Inc. (17.88%), United States
 Angola Block 14 B.V. (50.01%), Netherlands (operating in Angola)
 Angola LNG Limited (13.60%), Bermuda (operating in Angola)
 AS 24, France
 Atlantic Trading & Marketing Inc., United States
 Atotech (China) Chemicals Ltd
 Atotech B.V., Netherlands
 Atotech Deutschland GmbH, Germany
 Atotech Taiwan
 BASF TOTAL Petrochemicals LLC (40.00%), United States
 Brass Holdings Company Limited, Luxembourg
 Brass LNG Ltd (17.00%), Nigeria
 Compagnie Pétrolière de l’Ouest – CPO, France
 Cos-Mar Company (50.00%), United States
 Cosden LLC, United States
 Cray Valley USA LLC, United States
 CSSA – Chartering and Shipping Services S.A., Switzerland
 Dalian West Pacific Petrochemical Co. Ltd (WEPEC) (22.41%), China
 Dolphin Energy Limited (24.50%), United Arab Emirates
 E. F. Oil And Gas Limited, United Kingdom
 Elf Aquitaine, France
 Elf Aquitaine Fertilisants, France
 Elf Aquitaine Inc., United States
 Elf Exploration Production, France
 Elf Exploration UK Limited, United Kingdom
 Elf Petroleum Iran, France (operating in Iran)
 Elf Petroleum UK Limited, United Kingdom
 Gaz Transport & Technigaz S.A.S. (30.00%), France
 Grande Paroisse S.A., France
 Hanwha Total Petrochemicals Co. Ltd (50.00%), South Korea
 Hutchinson Argentina S.A.
 Hutchinson Autopartes De Mexico, S.A. de C.V.
 Hutchinson Corporation, United States 
 Hutchinson Do Brasil S.A., Brazil
 Hutchinson GmbH, Germany
 Hutchinson Poland SP Z.O.O.
 Hutchinson S.A., France
 Ichthys LNG PTY Ltd (30.00%), Australia
 Legacy Site Services LLC, United States
 LSS Funding Inc., United States
 Lubrilog SAS, France
 Naphtachimie (50.00%), France
 Nigeria LNG Ltd (15.00%)
 Novatek (16.96%), Russia
 Oman LNG LLC (5.54%)
 Omnium Reinsurance Company S.A., Switzerland
 Paulstra SNC, France
 PetroCedeño (30.32%), Venezuela
 Qatar Liquefied Gas Company Limited (II) Train B (16.70%)
 Qatar Petrochemical Company Q.S.C. (QAPCO) (20.00%)
 Qatargas Liquefied Gas Company Limited (10.00%)
 Qatofin Company Limited (49.09%), Qatar
 Saft Groupe S.A.
 Saudi Aramco Total Refining and Petrochemical Company (37.50%), Saudi Arabia
 Shtokman Development AG (25.00%), Switzerland (operating in Russia)
 Sigmakalon Group B.V., Netherlands
 SOCAP S.A.S., France
 Société Anonyme de la Raffinerie des Antilles (50.00%), France
 Société Civile Immobilière CB2, France
 SOFAX Banque, France
 SunPower Corporation (64.65%), United States
 TOTAL (BTC) S.A.R.L., Luxembourg
 TOTAL Énergie Développement, France
 TOTAL Énergie Gaz, France
 TOTAL Énergies Nouvelles Activités USA, France
 TOTAL Austral, France (operating in Argentina)
 TOTAL Belgium
 TOTAL Capital, France
 TOTAL Capital Canada Ltd
 TOTAL Capital International, France
 TOTAL China Investment Co. Ltd
 TOTAL Coal South Africa (PTY) Ltd
 TOTAL Colombia Pipeline, France (operating in Colombia)
 TOTAL Delaware Inc., United States
 TOTAL Deutschland GmbH, Germany
 TOTAL Dolphin Midstream Limited, Bermuda
 TOTAL Downstream UK PLC, United Kingdom
 Total E&P Absheron B.V., Netherlands (operating in Azerbaijan)
 Total E&P Algerie, France (operating in Algeria)
 Total E&P Angola, France (operating in Angola)
 Total E&P Angola Block 15 / 06 Limited, Bermuda (operating in Angola)
 Total E&P Angola Block 17 / 06, France (operating in Angola)
 Total E&P Angola Block 25, France (operating in Angola)
 Total E&P Angola Block 32, France (operating in Angola)
 Total E&P Angola Block 33, France (operating in Angola)
 Total E&P Angola Block 39, France (operating in Angola)
 Total E&P Angola Block 40, France (operating in Angola)
 Total E&P Arctic Russia, France
 Total E&P Australia, France (operating in Australia)
 Total E&P Australia II, France (operating in Australia)
 Total E&P Australia III, France (operating in Australia)
 Total E&P Azerbaijan B.V., Netherlands (operating in Azerbaijan)
 Total E&P Bolivie, France (operating in Bolivia)
 Total E&P Borneo B.V., Netherlands (operating in Brunei)
 Total E&P Bulgaria B.V., The Netherlands (operating in Bulgaria)
 Total E&P Canada Ltd
 Total E&P Chine, France (operating in China)
 Total E&P Colombie, France (operating in Colombia)
 Total E&P Congo (85.00%)
 Total E&P Cyprus B.V., The Netherlands (operating in Cyprus)
 Total E&P Do Brasil LTDA, Brazil
 Total E&P Dolphin Upstream Limited, Bermuda (operating in Qatar)
 Total E&P Dunga, Kazakhstan
 Total E&P France
 Total E&P Golfe Holdings Limited, Bermuda
 Total E&P Golfe Limited, United Arab (operating in Emirates Qatar)
 Total E&P Guyane Francaise, France
 Total E&P Holdings, France
 Total E&P Ichthys, France (operating in Australia)
 Total E&P Ichthys B.V., Netherlands (operating in Australia)
 Total E&P Indonesia West Papua, France (operating in Indonesia)
 Total E&P Indonesie, France (operating in Indonesia)
 Total E&P Iraq, France (operating in Iraq)
 Total E&P Italia, Italy
 Total E&P Kazakhstan, France (operating in Kazakhstan)
 Total E&P Kenya B.V., Netherlands (operating in Kenya)
 Total E&P Kurdistan Region of Iraq (Harir) B.V., Netherlands (operating in Iraq)
 Total E&P Kurdistan Region of Iraq (Safen) B.V., Netherlands (operating in Iraq)
 Total E&P Libye, France (operating in Libya)
 Total E&P Madagascar, France (operating in Madagascar)
 Total E&P Malaysia, France (operating in Malaysia)
 Total E&P Maroc, France (operating in Morocco)
 Total E&P Mauritanie, France (operating in Mauritania)
 Total E&P Mauritanie Block TA29 B.V., Netherlands (operating in Mauritania)
 Total E&P Mozambique B.V., Netherlands (operating in Mozambique)
 Total E&P Myanmar, France (operating in Myanmar)
 Total E&P Netherland B.V., Netherlands
 Total E&P Nigeria Deepwater D Limited
 Total E&P Nigeria Deepwater E Limited
 Total E&P Nigeria Ltd
 Total E&P Norge AS, Norway
 Total E&P Oman, France (operating in Oman)
 Total E&P Qatar, France (operating in Qatar)
 Total E&P Russie, France (operating in Russia)
 Total E&P South Africa B.V., Netherlands (operating in South Africa)
 Total E&P South East Mahakam, France (operating in Indonesia)
 Total E&P Syrie, France (operating in Syria)
 Total E&P Thailand, France (operating in Thailand)
 Total E&P Uganda B.V., Netherlands (operating in Uganda)
 Total E&P UK Limited, United Kingdom
 Total E&P Uruguay B.V., Netherlands (operating in Uruguay)
 Total E&P USA Inc., United States
 Total E&P Vietnam, France (operating in Vietnam)
 Total E&P Yamal, France
 Total E&P Yemen, France (operating in Yemen)
 TOTAL Especialidades Argentina
 TOTAL Exploration M’Bridge B.V., Netherlands (operating in Angola)
 TOTAL Exploration Production Nigeria, France
 TOTAL Finance, France
 TOTAL Finance Exploitation, France
 TOTAL Finance Global Services S.A., Belgium
 TOTAL Finance USA Inc., United States
 TOTAL Funding Nederland B.V., Netherlands
 TOTAL Gabon (58.28%)
 TOTAL Gas & Power Actifs Industriels, France
 TOTAL Gas & Power Limited, United Kingdom
 TOTAL Gas & Power North America Inc., United States
 TOTAL Gasandes, France
 TOTAL Gaz & Électricité Holdings France
 TOTAL Gestion Filiales, France
 TOTAL Gestion USA, France
 TOTAL GLNG Australia, France (operating in Australia)
 TOTAL Guinea Ecuatorial (80.00%), Equatorial Guinea
 TOTAL Holding Asie, France
 TOTAL Holding Dolphin Amont Limited, Bermuda
 TOTAL Holdings EUROPE, France
 TOTAL Holdings International B.V., Netherlands
 TOTAL Holdings Nederland B.V., Netherlands
 TOTAL Holdings UK Limited, United Kingdom
 TOTAL Holdings USA Inc., United States
 TOTAL International NV, Netherlands
 TOTAL Kenya (93.96%)
 TOTAL Lindsey Oil Refinery Ltd, United Kingdom
 TOTAL LNG Angola, France
 TOTAL LNG Nigeria Ltd, Bermuda
 TOTAL Lubrifiants (99.98%), France
 TOTAL Marketing Middle East Free Zone, United Arab Emirates
 TOTAL Marketing Services, France
 TOTAL Maroc, Morocco
 TOTAL Midstream Holdings UK Limited, United Kingdom
 TOTAL Mineraloel Und Chemie GmbH, Germany
 TOTAL Oil And Gas South America, France
 TOTAL Oil And Gas Venezuela B.V., Netherlands (operating in Venezuela)
 TOTAL Oil Turkiye AS, Turkey
 TOTAL Olefins Antwerp, Belgium
 TOTAL Outre-Mer, France
 TOTAL Participations Pétrolières Gabon
 TOTAL Petrochemicals & Refining S.A. / NV, Belgium
 TOTAL Petrochemicals & Refining USA Inc., United States
 TOTAL Petrochemicals France
 TOTAL Petroleum Angola, France (operating in Angola)
 TOTAL Profils Pétroliers, France
 TOTAL Qatar Oil And Gas, France
 TOTAL Raffinaderij Antwerpen NV, Belgium
 TOTAL Raffinage Chimie, France
 TOTAL Raffinage France
 TOTAL Raffinerie Mitteldeutschland GmbH, Germany
 TOTAL S.A., France
 TOTAL Shtokman B.V., Netherlands
 TOTAL South Africa (PTY) Ltd (50.10%)
 TOTAL Specialties USA Inc., United States
 TOTAL Treasury, France
 TOTAL UK Finance Ltd, United Kingdom
 TOTAL UK Limited, United Kingdom
 TOTAL Upstream Nigeria Limited
 TOTAL Upstream UK Limited, United Kingdom
 TOTAL Venezuela, France
 TOTAL Vostok, Russia
 TOTAL Yemen LNG Company Limited, Bermuda
 TotalErg SPA (49.00%), Italy
 TOTSA Total Oil Trading S.A., Switzerland
 Yamal LNG (33.59%), Russia
 Yemen LNG Company Ltd (39.62%), Bermuda (operating in Yemen)
 Zeeland Refinery N.V. (55.00%), Netherlands

Head office

The company's headquarters is in the Tour Total in the La Défense district in Courbevoie, France, near Paris. The building was originally constructed between 1983 and 1985 for Elf Aquitaine; Total SA acquired the building after its merger with Elf in 2000.

Senior management
The present chairman and CEO of the company is Patrick Pouyanné (2014 to present). In 2015, Patricia Barbizet was named Lead Independent Director.

Group Performance Management Committee
The role of this committee is to examine, analyze and pilot the Group's safety, financial and business results. In addition to the members of the executive committee, this committee is composed of the managers in charge of the main business units of the group, as well as a limited number of senior vice presidents of functions at group and branch levels. Since 2016, the committee has included:

 For group functions, the senior vice presidents in charge of corporate communications, legal, hse, and strategy & climate.
 For exploration and production, the senior vice presidents in charge of the following business units: Africa, Americas, Asia Pacific, Europe, and Central Asia, the Middle East / North Africa, Exploration, and one function, decided by the Comex.
 For gas, renewables, and power, the president gas & power and a function chosen by the executive committee
 For refining and chemicals, the senior vice presidents in charge of the following business units: Refining and Base Chemicals Europe, Refining and Petrochemicals Orient, Polymers, Hutchinson, and one function, decided by the Comex.
 For trading shipping, the senior vice president trading shipping.
 For marketing and services, the senior vice presidents in charge of the following business units: Europe, Africa, Global Businesses, and one function, decided by the Comex.
 For Total global services, the president Total global services.

Executive committee
The executive committee is Total's primary decision-making organization. Since 2020, members of Total's executive committee have been:
 Patrick Pouyanné, chairman and CEO.
 Arnaud Breuillac, president of Exploration & Production.
 Patrick de La Chevardière, chief financial officer.
 Alexis Vovk, president Marketing & Services.
 Philippe Sauquet, President, Gas, Renewables & Power and executive vice president, Strategy & Innovation
 Namita Shah, executive vice president, People & Social Responsibility
 Bernard Pinatel, President Refining & Chemicals

Operations
In May 2014, the company shelved its Joslyn North oil sands project in the Athabasca region of Alberta, Canada indefinitely, citing concerns about operating costs. An estimated $11 billion has been spent on the project, in which Total is the largest shareholder with 38.5%. Suncor Energy holds 36.75%, Occidental Petroleum owns 15% and Japan's Inpex has a 10% interest.

Total is involved in 23 projects of exploration and production in Africa, Asia, Europe, North America, South America and Russia.

Investments
In 1937, Iraq Petroleum Company (IPC), 23.75 percent owned by Total, signed an oil concession agreement with the Sultan of Muscat. IPC offered financial support to raise an armed force that would assist the Sultan in occupying the interior region of Oman, an area that geologists believed to be rich in oil. This led to the 1954 outbreak of Jebel Akhdar War in Oman that lasted for more than 5 years.

Total has been a significant investor in the Iranian energy sector since 1990. In 2017, Total and the National Iranian Oil Company (NIOC) signed a contract for the development and production of South Pars, the world's largest gas field. The project will have a production capacity of 2 billion cubic feet per day. The produced gas will supply the Iranian domestic market starting in 2021.

During the European Union's sanctions against the military dictatorship Myanmar, Total is able to operate the Yadana natural gas pipeline from Burma to Thailand. Total is currently the subject of a lawsuit in French and Belgian courts for the condoning and use of the country's civilian slavery to construct the pipeline. The documentary 'Total Denial' shows the background of this project. The NGO Burma Campaign UK is currently campaigning against this project.

Acquisitions
In 2011, Total agreed to buy 60% of photovoltaics company SunPower for US$1.38 billion. By the 2013 annual reporting date, Total owned 64.65%.

In 2016, Total agreed to purchase French battery maker Saft Groupe S.A. for 1.1 billion euros.

In 2016, Total signed a $224M deal to buy Lampiris, the third-largest Belgian supplier of gas and renewable energy to expand its gas and power distribution activities.

In December 2016, Total acquired about 23% of Tellurian for an amount of 207 million dollars, to develop an integrated gas project.

In 2017, Total announced it would buy Maersk Oil from A.P. Moller-Maersk in a deal expected to close in the first quarter of 2018.

In 2018, Total announced it was buying 74% of the French electricity and gas provider Direct Énergie from their main stockholders, for 1.4 billion euros.

In 2022, Total announced it had added 4GW to its renewable energy portfolio through the acquisition of the Austin-based company, Core Solar. The following month, Total entered an agreement with GIP to acquire a 50% stake in Clearway, one of the largest renewable energy owners in the United States. As part of the transaction, GIP took a 50% minus one share stake in SunPower.

Western Sahara oil exploration
In 2001, Total signed a contract for oil-reconnaissance in areas offshore Western Sahara (near Dakhla), with the "Moroccan Office National de Recherches et d’Exploitations Petrolières" (ONAREP). In 2002, Hans Corell (the United Nations Under-Secretary-General for Legal Affairs) stated in a letter to the president of the Security Council that whenever the contracts are only for exploration they're not illegal, but if further exploration or exploitation are against the interests and wishes of the people of Western Sahara, they would be in violation of the principles of international law.
Finally, Total decided to not renew their license off Western Sahara.

Energy Deal with ADNOC
In a move to cope with the 2021-2022 global energy crisis, which started with the onset of the Covid-19 pandemic and aggravated with Russia’s 2022 invasion of Ukraine, France’s TotalEnergies and UAE’s ADNOC signed a strategic deal to partner on energy projects “for cooperation in the area of energy supplies”.

The deal was secured on the second day of the UAE leader Sheikh Mohamed bin Zayed Al-Nahyan’s visit to Paris in 2022. The visit marked the UAE president’s first overseas state visit since assuming the post earlier that year.

The deal was aimed at identifying and targeting potential joint investment projects in the UAE, France, and elsewhere in the sectors of renewables, hydrogen, and nuclear energy, as told by the French government in one of its statements. According to French President Emmanuel Macron’s aides, France had been eager to secure diesel supply from the UAE.

The deal also received criticism from human rights groups that persisted Macron not to give the-then “crown prince a pass on the UAE’s atrocious human rights record”, as per the statement published by Human Rights Watch on its website.

Controversies

Environmental and safety records 
In 1998, the Total SA company was fined €375,000 for an oil spill that stretched 400 kilometers from La Rochelle to the western tip of Brittany. The company was only fined that amount because they were only partially liable because Total SA did not own the ship. The plaintiffs had sought more than $1.5 billion in damages. More than 100 groups and local governments joined in the suit. The Total company was fined just over $298,000. The majority of the money will go to the French government, several environmental groups, and various regional governments. The Total SA company was also fined $550,000 for the amount of marine pollution that came from it. After the oil spill they tried to restore their image and have opened a sea turtle conservation project in Masirah in recent years.
	
Prior to the verdict in which Total was found guilty one of the counterparts in the incident, Malta Maritime Authority (MMA), was not to be tried for having any hand in the incident. In 2005, Total submitted a report to the Paris courts which stated that Total had gathered a group of experts which stated the tanker was corroded and that Total was responsible for it. The courts sought a second expert reviewing this information, which was turned down.

In 2001, the AZF chemical plant exploded in Toulouse, France, while belonging to the Grande Paroisse branch of Total.

In 2008, Total was required to pay €192 million in compensation to victims of the pollution caused by the sinking of the ship Erika. This was in addition to the €200 million that Total spent to help clean up the spill. The company appealed twice against the verdict, losing both times.

In 2016, Total was ranked as the second-best of 92 oil, gas, and mining companies on indigenous rights in the Arctic. According to the CDP Carbon Majors Report 2017, the company was one of the top 100 companies producing carbon emissions globally, responsible for .9% of global emissions from 1998 to 2015. In 2021, Total was ranked as the 2nd most environmentally responsible company out of 120 oil, gas, and mining companies involved in resource extraction north of the Arctic Circle in the Arctic Environmental Responsibility Index (AERI).

According to a 2021 study, Total personnel were aware about the role that their products played in global warming as early as 1971, as well as throughout the 1980s. Despite this awareness, the company promoted doubt regarding the science of global warming by the late 1980s, and ultimately settled on a position in the late 1990s of publicly accepting climate science, while still promoting doubt and trying to delay climate action.

Bribery 
Total has been accused of bribery on multiple occasions.

Total is being implicated in a bribe commission scandal which is currently emerging in Malta. It has emerged that Total had told Maltese agents that it would not be interested in doing business with them unless their team included George Farrugia, who is under investigation in the procurement scandal. George Farrugia has recently been given a presidential pardon in exchange for information about this scandal. Enemalta, Malta's energy supplier, swiftly barred Total and its agents, Trafigura from bidding and tenders. An investigation is currently underway and three people have been arraigned 

On 16 December 2008, the managing director of the Italian division of Total, Lionel Levha, and ten other executives were arrested by the public Prosecutor's office of Potenza, Italy, for a corruption charge of €15 million to undertake the oilfield in Basilicata on contract. Also arrested was the local deputy of Partito Democratico Salvatore Margiotta and an Italian entrepreneur.

In 2010, Total was accused of bribing Iraqi officials during former president Saddam Hussein's regime to secure oil supplies. A United Nations report later revealed that Iraqi officials had received bribes from oil companies to secure contracts worth over $10bn. On 26 February 2016, the Paris Court of Appeals considered Total guilty and ordered the company to pay a fine of €750,000 for corrupting Iraqi civil servants. The court's ruling overturns an earlier acquittal in the case.

In 2013, a case was settled that concerned charges that Total bribed an Iranian official with $60 million, which they documented as a "consulting charge," and which unfairly gave them access to Iran's Sirri A and Sirri E oil and gas fields. The bribery gave them a competitive advantage, earning them an estimated $150 million in profits. The Securities Exchange Commission and the Department of Justice settled the charges, expecting Total to pay $398 million.

2022 Russian invasion of Ukraine 
Following the 2022 Russian invasion of Ukraine which began on February 24, many international, particularly Western companies pulled out of Russia. On March 1, TotalEnergies announced it "will no longer provide capital for new projects in Russia" but has retained ownership of its 19.4% stake in privately owned Novatek, 20% stake in the Yamal project and 10% stake in Arctic LNG 2. This has led to criticism as insufficient, particularly given complete divestment of other major Western energy companies, and the European Union announcement of becoming more energy independent from Russia.
Similarly in August 2022, an investigation by Global Witness showed that a Siberian gas field part-owned by TotalEnergies has been supplying a refinery, which is producing jet fuel for Russian warplanes. This contradicts Total´s claims that this was unrelated to Russian military operations in Ukraine.

Africa 
In December 2022, the NGOs Friends of the Earth, Survie and four Ugandan NGOs sent the oil group Total to court and accused it of violating the law on the duty of vigilance of large French companies in terms of human rights and environment. The Tilenga Project, which TotalEnergies is undertaking in conjunction with China National Offshore Oil Corporation consists of drilling for oil in the Murchison Falls National Park, a habitat for diverse species of birds and animals. and isThe project also involves building a pipeline from the site in land-locked Uganda to Tanga in Tanzania. Critics of the project are concerned that, since the proposed pipeline passes through Lake Victoria and close to a number of wildlife areas in Tanzania and Kenya, oil spills could have threaten the lake and could have adverse effects on the wildlife, some of which is endangered, in various national parks.

Automobile and motorcycle OEM partnerships
TotalEnergies is an official recommended fuel and lubricants for all prominent Renault–Nissan–Mitsubishi Alliance members, including Renault (shared with BP), Nissan (shared with ExxonMobil), Infiniti, Dacia, Alpine and Datsun, Kia Motors, three Stellantis marques (Citroën, Peugeot and DS), Honda (including Acura, shared with BP and ExxonMobil), Aston Martin, Mazda (shared with BP and its subsidiary Castrol), Sany and Tata Motors (shared with Petronas) for automobiles only as well as Peugeot Motocycles, Kawasaki (fuel only), Energica, and Honda for motorcycles only.

Sponsorship

Total has provided fuel and lubricants to professional auto racing teams.

Total has been a longtime partner of Citroën Sport in the World Rally Championship, Dakar Rally and World Touring Car Championship. Sébastien Loeb won nine WRC drivers titles, whereas Ari Vatanen and Pierre Lartigue won four editions of the Dakar Rally.

Total has been a partner of Peugeot Sport in Formula One from 1995 to 2000, the British Touring Car Championship in 1995 and 1996 and since 2001 in the World Rally Championship, Intercontinental Rally Challenge, 24 Hours of Le Mans, Intercontinental Le Mans Cup, Dakar Rally and Pikes Peak International Hill Climb. Total is also a partner of Peugeot Sport for its customer racing TCR Touring Car programme.

Total was a partner of Renault Sport in Formula One from 2009 to 2016. Their logo appeared on the Red Bull Racing cars between 2009 and 2016, the Renault F1 cars in 2009, 2010 and 2016, and the Lotus F1 cars from 2011 to 2014. Total also partnered Caterham F1 Team in 2011–2014, Scuderia Toro Rosso in 2014–2015 and Williams F1 Team in 2012–2013.

Also, Total was the title sponsor of the Copa Sudamericana football tournament in 2013 and 2014.

In 2017, Total was appointed by FIA and ACO as official fuel supplier of World Endurance Championship and 24 Hours of Le Mans from 2018–19 season onwards.

Total is one of the official sponsors for one of the most popular and influential Mexican football teams, Club America.

In terms of educational development, Total provides scholarships worth millions of euros annually to international students to study in France. These programs are mainly for master's degrees. Doctoral scholarships are also offered but in limited numbers. The students mainly come from Europe, Africa, Asia, and the Middle East where Total Operates. Students from Africa are mainly from Nigeria. The scholarship involves the payment of Tuition and a monthly allowance of 1400 Euros (2014 disbursement). The allowance is able to cater for feeding, transportation, and accommodation for the students. The drop in oil prices in 2015 has led to the reduction of the number of scholars.

In 2016, Total secured an eight-year sponsorship package from the Confederation of African Football (CAF) to support 10 of its principal competitions. Total will start with the Africa Cup of Nations to be held in Gabon, therefore, renaming it Total Africa Cup of Nations.

Following Total's purchase of Direct Énergie in the summer of 2018, the  cycling team changed its name the following year to Total Direct Énergie ahead of that year's edition of Paris–Roubaix. In 2021 the team changed its name again to Team TotalEnergies in time for that year's Tour de France.

In 2019, the company's Chief Executive Officer, Patrick Pouyanne pledged that Total would make a €100 million contribution to the reconstruction of the Notre-Dame cathedral after it was extensively damaged in a fire.

In 2020, the company confirmed a two-year sponsorship deal with CR Flamengo, being the first time a partner of a Brazilian football team.

See also 

 2005 Hertfordshire Oil Storage Terminal fire
 2007 UK petrol contamination
 Centre Scientifique et Technique Jean Féger, main technical and scientific research center for Total in Pau, France
 ERAP
 Fossil fuels lobby
 Lindsey Oil Refinery

Notes

References

External links 

 
 

 
1920s initial public offerings
Automotive fuel retailers
CAC 40
Chemical companies established in 1924
Chemical companies of France
Companies based in Île-de-France
Companies in the Euro Stoxx 50
Companies listed on Euronext Paris
Conglomerate companies established in 1924
Conglomerate companies of France
Energy companies of France
Energy companies established in 1924
French companies established in 1924
Multinational companies headquartered in France
Multinational oil companies
Non-renewable resource companies established in 1924
Oil companies of France
Privatized companies of France